Route 605 is a  long north–south secondary highway in the eastern portion of New Brunswick, Canada.

The route starts at Route 104 in Millville north of the town of Nackawic. The road travels southwest through the community of Maple Ridge and past Temperance Vale and Pinder. The road passes the southern terminus of Route 595 and follows the east side of the Nackawic River before ending at Route 105 in Nackawic.

History

See also

References

605
605